Julius Sherrod Scott III (July 31, 1955 – December 6, 2021) was an American scholar of slavery and Caribbean and Atlantic history. He was best known for his influential doctoral thesis and later book The Common Wind: Afro-American Currents in the Age of the Haitian Revolution. Scott's original thesis has been regarded as "arguably the most read, sought after and discussed English-language dissertation in the humanities and social sciences during the 20th century", elevating the historian to the position of an intellectual "cult figure among scholars" in the field.

Early life
Julius Sherrod Scott III was born on July 31, 1955, in Marshall, Texas, to Julius Samuel Scott, Jr. and Ianthia "Ann" Scott née Harrell. Julius Jr. was a Methodist minister who later served as president of Paine College (1975–1982) and Wiley College (1996–2001); Ann was a librarian.

According to his mother, young "Scotty" was a bright child with a precise sense for language. In 1961, he began attending MacGregor Elementary School in Houston as one of the first Black students in its newly-integrated first grade class. Despite the instruction being officially integrated, Scotty and the Black girl in his class were only permitted to use a single segregated restroom outside the school. Scotty’s parents learned of this fact only after hearing him say "Thank you, God, for letting me have my own bathroom at school" during his prayers.

After Scotty completed second grade, his parents moved the family to Providence, Rhode Island, where Julius Jr. had accepted a job at Brown University. Scott enrolled at Brown in 1973 and received a bachelor of arts in history from the university in 1977. He attended Duke University for graduate studies, earning a doctorate in history in 1986.

Career

The Common Wind 

Scott’s doctoral dissertation "The Common Wind: Afro-American Currents in the Age of Revolution" formed the basis of his later, highly influential work of the same title. After spending time in North Carolina preparing for field research, in February 1982 he started examining archives of the British Vice admiralty court in Kingston, Jamaica, then proceeded to Port-au-Prince, Haiti in April 1982 to study Haitian archives.  He submitted his completed dissertation in 1986.

As an unpublished dissertation The Common Wind was cited hundreds of times in scholarly literature. In Time, historian Vincent Brown called the dissertation "so exciting, original, and profound" that it inspired "an entire generation to create a new field of knowledge about the past". Eugene Holley, writing in Publishers Weekly, described the dissertation as "renowned for its creativity, imaginative research and graceful prose".

Scott initially signed a contract with Oxford University Press to publish the dissertation in book form shortly after completing his degree, but did not agree with suggestions for revision and opted not to publish the book. Aside from a selection from one chapter of the dissertation reprinted in the 2010 volume Origins of the Black Atlantic, which Scott co-edited, the dissertation remained unpublished until a Verso Books editor, referred by another historian, offered to publish the text with minimal revisions. The Common Wind was published by Verso in 2018.

Scott taught at Duke and the University of Michigan, where he was Lecturer of Afroamerican and African Studies. He died on December 6, 2021, in Ann Arbor, Michigan, from complications related to diabetes.

References 

1955 births
2021 deaths
Brown University alumni
Duke University alumni
Historians of African Americans
Historians of the Caribbean
Historians of slavery
People from Marshall, Texas
University of Michigan faculty